Synovioma may refer to:

 Benign synovioma, or giant-cell tumor of the tendon sheath
 Malignant synovioma, also known as: synovial sarcoma